Digital Fashion is the visual representation of clothing built using computer technologies and 3D software.
This industry is on the rise due to ethical awareness and uses of digital fashion technology such as artificial intelligence to create products with complex social and technical software.

Digital fashion is also the interplay between digital technology and couture. Information and communication technologies (ICTs) have been deeply integrated both into the fashion industry, as well as within the experience of clients and prospects. Such interplay has happened at three main levels.
 ICTs are used to design and produce fashion products, while also the industry organization leverages onto digital technologies
 ICTs impact marketing, distribution and sales
 ICTs are extensively used in communication activities with all relevant stakeholders, and contribute to co-create the fashion world
The fashion industry in general has paved the way for digital fashion to be introduced with more technology being in the industry like virtual dressing rooms and the gamification of the fashion industry. Digital fashion is also seen in many different online fashion retail websites. It may be seen on common websites you shop on. This evolution in the fashion industry has called for more education and research of digital fashion which will also be discussed in this article.

Design, production, and organization 
Among the many applications available to fashion designers to model the fusion of creativity with digital avenues, the Digital Textile Printing can be mentioned here.

Digital textile printing
Digital textile printing has brought together the worlds of fashion, technology, art, chemistry, and printing to produce a new process for printing textiles on clothing.

Digital printing is a process in which prints are directly applied to fabrics with printer, reducing 95% the use of water, 75% the use of energy, and minimizing textile waste. The main advantage of digital printing is the ability to do very small runs of each design (even less than 1 yard). 

Digital Textile printing also offers other benefits such fast printing speeds that help the time and space needed to print different patterns on garments of choice.
https://ourfashionpassion.com/how-to-style-a-slit-skirt-with-plenty-of-options-in-2022/

Digital Textile printing is “probably the greatest innovation of 21-st century fashion" as declared by Christina Binkley in the Wall Street Journal. The “vastly improved digital printing technologies allow designers to innovate while beefing up their brands“. 

Brands such as Prada, Pucci or Jil Sander are using this technology to invent their design ideas on fabric.

Marketing, distribution, and sales 
While all digital channels can be used in order to market and sell fashion completely online (eCommerce), they usually are implemented in connection with offline channels (so-called "omni-channel"). Here, Virtual and Augmented reality is playing a crucial role.

The fashion industry has faced its own problems including pollution and fabric waste, which has resulted in a shift to more sustainable methods like digital fashion. The industry is also constantly being intertwined with digital media and has allowed for the use of digital tools within the business itself and with consumers. Two of the ways digital fashion is utilized with consumers is through virtual dressing rooms and virtual cosmetic counters.

Prospects and clients can use ICTs - own computers, tablets and smartphones - to skip fitting rooms and cosmetics counters, and instead virtually see how they look in specific outfits and makeup via in-store kiosks, mobile phones or tablets. Modiface is a web application that anyone can use to give them a virtual makeover. Customers can give any look and decide on what to suits and buy products.

Sephora, the beauty specialty retailer, and ModiFace, an augmented reality virtual makeover technology provider, today announced the launch of a 3D Augmented Reality Mirror that can simulate cosmetics on a user's face in real-time and in 3D. The new patented technology, created by ModiFace, tracks the precise location of a user's facial features and applies eye shadow colors directly on the video feed from a camera.

Oftentimes beauty retailers will feature virtual fitting rooms to allow users to experience the look of their product before committing to a purchase. Some examples are color contact retailers Freshlook, which allows users to simulate contact lens wear in their color contacts studio before purchase. Colorful Eyes also offers a virtual color contact lens try on room.

Virtual dressing room
A virtual dressing room (also often referred to as virtual fitting room and virtual changing room although they do perform different functions) is the online equivalent of the near-ubiquitous in-store changing room – that is, it enables shoppers to try on clothes to check one or more of size, fit or style, but virtually rather than physically.

The multimedia communication company Eyemagnet developed the Virtual Dressing Room for the Hallensteins menswear chain. The changing room is transformed to a single panel which reflects the user. These users can then use simple arm and hand gestures to ‘try on’ any apparel in the store, take a photo of any selected outfit and have it sent to their mobile phone. Newer versions of this technology eliminate the arm-waving altogether.

Fashion retailer Topshop installed a Kinect-powered virtual fitting room at its Moscow store. Created by AR Door, the Augmented Fitting Room system overlays 3D augmented reality clothes on the customer. Simple gestures and on-screen buttons let users "try on" different outfits. However, the high variability of virtual fit platforms to predict consumer clothes sizes called into question the accuracy of these systems in their current form.

Nike is among the brands that have incorporated ground-breaking AR technology that allows customers to try on shoes virtually. This function incorporated in 2019 into both Nike's mobile app and retail stores is called "Nike Fit" and was created so that costumers can accurately determine their shoe size, as according to their website “three out of every five people are likely wearing the wrong size shoe”.

In June 2020, Gucci partnered up with Snapchat and unveiled a filter that allowed users to test how the brand's shoes looked on their feet.

Communication and experience co-creation 
Fashion is also a matter of socially negotiating what is "in" or "out", fashionable or not. In other words, fashion items do not only play on the economic market of physical goods, but also - and sometimes even more importantly - on the semiotic market of the production of social tastes and customs. Thanks to social media, and to all services offered by the so-called web2.0, laypeople can contribute to co-create the fashion world, shaping tastes, customs, and fashion-related values.

Social media in general has catapulted the impact fashion has on our everyday lives and values. Fashion has taken a central role is mass production and is constantly evolving due to the ever-lasting digital transformation.

Social media has also helped evolved to a point where not only can brands reach consumers, but consumers can reach brands as well. TikTok for example started a trend in 2020 with #GucciModelChallenge. This creates a space where the brand is gaining awareness from their consumers in the ever-changing digital age. 

For this reason, social media is becoming an extremely strong marketing tool specifically in the fashion industry as well. This can be seen with fashion bloggers or influencers showing clothing from various brands that connects the consumers and brands globally across different platforms.

Gamification 
Gaming has played an important role in fostering digital aspects of the fashion world, first beginning with dress up games that used avatars and allowed players to select garments. Nevertheless, it seems it will now move on to the real world and start using avatars of real people.

Garments from luxurious brands have been copied and adapted into the aesthetics of games such as the quarantine-released Animal Crossing: New Horizons and The Sims. As to the former, users found themselves filled with time during the COVID-19 confinement and recreated outfits from a great variety of fashion brands, including Chanel, Gucci and Versace. Moreover, it became a platform for users to showcase their costume designs.

In April 2019, Moschino collaborated with simulation game The Sims in a capsule collection that featured signature Jeremy Scott garments. The collection was made available to shop and the campaign was set against the backdrop of a Sims-like atmosphere. Furthermore, in May 2019, Nike partnered up with Fortnite to include their iconic Jordan sneakers. In similar fashion, in May 2020, Marc Jacobs designed 6 of the brand's favorite looks for Nintendo's Animal Crossing: New Horizons in a partnership with Instagram user @AnimalCrossingFashionArchive. They were made available to download. Valentino also collaborated with the account and provided 20 looks from the house's SS (Spring/Summer) and F/W (Fall/Winter) 2020 collections.

Similarly the other luxury brands mentioned, Louis Vuitton partnered with game League of Legends to create skins for characters within the game. Digital fashion in various different video games allow users to express themselves beyond their avatar and combine the self-expression of fashion into the digital gaming realm.

Digital fashion education and research 
Nowadays, the fashion industry needs experts in digital fashion, equipped with the above-sketched knowledge and competences. Several Bachelor and Master programs in Fashion have in recent years integrated Digital Fashion courses.

Another example is Ravensbourne University's 'Digital Technology for Fashion Pathway,' launching October 2021. This new pathway will offer BA Fashion students the option to specialise in digital fashion with a focus on emerging technologies within this field. The Ravensbourne BA Fashion Class of 2020 paved the way for this new offering by collaborating with the gaming department and launching a digital fashion game live and in partnership with Twitch in July 2020, and featured in Forbes as 'Visionary.'

In 2021, University for the Creative Arts became the first major arts university to launch a new postgraduate higher education degree in Digital Fashion, the first Master's course of its kind in the UK. This new course allows creative researchers to learn how to create garments which are completely free from the material world, and how to fit them digitally to a client – whether they are a model for a virtual catwalk, a social media influencer looking to boost their reach, a gaming avatar in need of a fashion edge or a movie character being given a bespoke costume.

While there are not (yet) dedicated scientific journals devoted to the topic, several research activities have been done in the field. Among them, a dedicated conference has taken place in 2015 in Seoul, South Korea. SComS - Studies in Communication Sciences, a Swiss-based Communication Journal, has published a special thematic section on Fashion communication: Between tradition and digital transformation. In July 2019, a conference titled FACTUM19 - Fashion Communication: between tradition and future digital developments has taken place in Ascona (Switzerland), whose proceedings are published by Springer. During FACTUM19, a document titled "Fashion Communication Research. A way ahead" has been published.

Fashion is closely related with Art and Heritage. Several museums related to fashion have started to make their appearance in the past thirty years. Examples are the Museum Christian Dior Granville, the Museum Cristobal Balenciaga, The Armani Silos,The Museum Audemars Piguet. Among the most important initiatives to digitize fashion history, thus making such heritage available to researchers, practitioners and all interested people, two projects can be mentioned: Europeana Fashion and We Wear Culture by Google Arts and Culture.

The rise of digital fashion during COVID-19 
Since the beginning of the 2020 pandemic, the fashion industry has suffered strong economic losses, as sales plummeted and jobs were lost, but it has since learned to digitally recover through virtual clothing, catwalks, and showrooms.

Amidst the COVID-19 pandemic, fashion is among the industries that have been forced to adapt their commercial and creative strategies to better suit the social distancing measures. Therefore, the digital channel has since seen a rise in use, offering live shopping and has been highlighted as the only way to overcome physical barriers. It is also believed that these changes will prevail in years to come, as reported by WGSN.

Fashion brands and well-known personalities in the industry spread welfare messages on social media and brands such as Louis Vuitton, Balenciaga, Gucci and Prada began mass-producing face masks and hospital gowns in order to help with the shortage of the coveted sanitary product. Moreover, brands stepped up and launched initiatives to aid in the battle of COVID-19's impact on economy. Ralph Lauren donated $10 million to help fight coronavirus and initiated the transport of free coffee and baked goods to New York hospitals to thank healthcare workers for their service.

Once events only attended by selected people, catwalks and showrooms have become more accessible through live streaming and virtual fashion shows. Thus, they have resulted in high fashion becoming more procurable to the general public. Milan Fashion Week was renamed “Milan Digital Fashion Week” and the New York version prioritized outdoor spaces to further prevent the spread and set the maximum capacity at 50. The British Fashion Council also took upon the opportunity to show this year's designs online. Consequently, many celebrities decided to watch fashion shows that they used to attend front row from the comfort of their own homes and showed their glamorous looks from their Instagram pages.

In 2021, big virtual fashion events are becoming more common. An example of this is the International digital Fashion Week. With this event, there is the largest virtual fashion show being held with over 100 designers in the fashion industry being represented. This has occurred as a result to the COVID-19 pandemic. However, now digital fashion has a chance to thrive in a new technology and fashion fusion industry.

The importance of fashion films has also been stressed as a medium to creatively show designers' upcoming collections. As a result, methods that were only used by digital focused houses such as The Fabricant are expected to become the norm. Therefore, 3D experiences have gained momentum. As a matter of fact, high-profile models such as Bella Hadid have already incorporated such advanced and revolutionary practices into their curriculum, as seen in an Instagram post that displays the star getting a full body 3D scan for a Mugler Spring Summer 2021 film. The video shows her in a gold outfit as Pegasus, against the backdrop of a fantasy-filled world.

Other embraced formats include avatar videogames such as Zepeto, which Louboutin partnered up with to showcase their SS21 collection. This way, attendees could create personalized avatars and view the brand's latest designs. On June 15, Balmain also resorted to digital fashion and created a virtual showroom hosted by the avatar of creative director Oliver Rousteing, who posted on Instagram his face getting 3D scanned, adding "#future".

Additionally, for their SS21 show, Italian streetwear brand GCDS recreated a 3D runway with cutting-edge technology and avatars that displayed the digitally rendered clothes. They even incorporated the celebrity avatars of Dua Lipa, Anwar Hadid, Chiara Ferragni and Fedez, to name a few. They were shown sitting front row in the audience as if it had been a traditional show. It was referred to by the brand as the "first digital front row".

The role of avatar influencers such as Lil Miquela and Noonoouri has been emphasized as well and definitely had an impact on the fashion industry during the pandemic, as they encouraged sales with the promotion of fashion brands.

One advantage of the digitalization of fashion is being eco-friendly, as it reduces fabric waste. Opposing beliefs state that clothing is only meant to be worn in real life, and that the process involved with sewing has always been sacred.

See also 
History of Western fashion
Index of fashion articles
Fast fashion

References

External links
 
 

Fashion
Digital art